Gene Locklear is a former Major League Baseball outfielder, born in Lumberton, North Carolina. He played all or part of five seasons, from  until , in the major leagues.

He played in their farm system until . He made the Reds' Opening Day roster in 1973, making his major league debut on April 5. In June, he was traded to the San Diego Padres, for whom he played until . He was then traded to the New York Yankees, for whom he played 13 games in 1976 and one game in 1977. After spending most of the latter year with the Syracuse Chiefs minor league baseball team, he signed with the Fighters, where he ended his career. This included hitting four home runs in a single AAA game at Columbus, Ohio in 1978.

Locklear is a full-blooded member of the Lumbee people. After his baseball career, he worked as a commercial artist.

References

External links

 Gene Locklear (official website).

1949 births
Living people
20th-century Native Americans
American expatriate baseball players in Japan
Asheville Tourists players
Baseball players from North Carolina
Cincinnati Reds players
Hawaii Islanders players
Indianapolis Indians players
Lumbee people
Major League Baseball outfielders
Native American male artists
Native American baseball players
New York Yankees players
Nippon Ham Fighters players
People from Lumberton, North Carolina
San Diego Padres players
Sioux Falls Packers players
Syracuse Chiefs players
Tampa Tarpons (1957–1987) players
Trois-Rivières Aigles players